Jassim Ismail Juma (1 January 1938 – 11 February 2023) was a Kuwaiti diplomat and politician. An independent, he served in the National Assembly from 1971 to 1975.

Juma died in Kuwait City on 11 February 2023, at the age of 85.

References

1938 births
2023 deaths
Members of the National Assembly (Kuwait)
People from Kuwait City